A şarkı is an art song in Ottoman classical music which forms one of the movements of a fasıl (suite). It is performed with an usul (metric structure). This kind of song is rarely performed today. In modern Turkish, şarkı is the common word for any song, Turkish or foreign.

Turkish music
Vocal music
Turkish words and phrases
Musical forms

tr:Şarkı (edebiyat)